Lists of Gaelic games clubs include:

 List of Gaelic games clubs in Ireland
 List of Gaelic games clubs outside Ireland